"Inside Love" is a song by the British AOR band Seven, released in 1990 as their debut single. It was written by Keith McFarlane and Simon LeFevre, and produced by John Parr. "Inside Love" reached No. 78 in the UK, and remained in the Top 100 for four weeks.

Seven had secured a contract with Polydor in 1989. They produced two singles from the label; "Inside Love" and "Man With a Vision". Both were produced by Parr. A promotional video was filmed to promote the single.

"Inside Love" was released by Polydor in the UK only on 7" vinyl, 12" vinyl and CD. The B-side, "Till Then", was also written by Macfarlane and Lefevre, and produced by Tim Lewis and Mike Parker. The 12" vinyl and CD formats of the single also featured an extended version of "Inside Love".

The lack of success of "Inside Love" and "Man With a Vision" led to the band being dropped by Polydor and subsequently splitting. Later in 2014, the original line-up of Seven reunited and released their self-titled debut album that year through Escape Music. Seven included a re-recorded version of "Inside Love".

Critical reception
For one UK magazine, Phillip Schofield described the track as a "moody ballad that wiggles its way inside your brain forever after a couple of plays." Cover Boys magazine stated: "If you're familiar with the sounds of American bands like Journey and Foreigner, then you'll understand a little of how Seven sound."

Formats
7" single
"Inside Love" - 3:53
"Till Then" - 3:51

12" single
"Inside Love (Extended Version)" - 6:46
"Inside Love" - 3:53
"Till Then" - 3:51

CD single
"Inside Love" - 3:53
"Till Then" - 3:51
"Inside Love (Extended Version)" - 6:46

Chart performance

Personnel
Seven
 Mick Devine - lead vocals
 Keith Macfarlane - guitar, backing vocals
 Pat Davey - bass guitar, backing vocals
 Simon Lefevre - keyboards, backing vocals
 Austin Lane - drums

Production
 John Parr - producer of "Inside Love"
 Tim Lewis, Mike Parker - producers of "Till Then"
 John Spence - engineer on "Inside Love"
 Stephen W Taylor - remixing on "Inside Love"

Other
 Paul Cox - photography
 Stylorouge - design
 John Wolff, Mike Parker - management

References

1990 singles
1990 songs
Polydor Records singles